Arlequin roi de Serendib is a three-act farce by Alain-René Lesage.  It was first performed at the Foire Saint-Germain in 1713.

Plot summary
After being marooned on the island of Serendib, Pierrot and Mezzetin are separated from Arlequin.  Pierrot and Mezzetin, being familiar with the customs of the island, disguise themselves as women to avoid being killed and are appointed priestesses by the natives.  Arlequin, on the other hand, allows himself to be captured, and the natives crown him king.  Arlequin enjoys some of the perks of kingship, including fancy meals, a formal portrait sitting, concubines, and a personal physician, before he discovers that the natives sacrifice their kings to their gods.

Before the sacrifice, however, Mezzetin creates a diversion, as he too would like to escape from Serendib where he is being courted by the Grand Visir.  Mezzetin, Pierrot, and Arlequin escape to Paris.

Characters
Arlequin, king of Serendib
Mezzetin, disguised as the grand priestess
Pierrot, disguised as her confidente
The Grand Visir
The Grand Sacrificer
A Painter
A Doctor
Harem girls
A Greek girl

External links
Arlequin roi de Serendib at Gallica

1713 plays
Plays by Alain-René Lesage